Bobaia may refer to several villages in Romania:

 Bobaia, a village in Aninoasa, Gorj
 Bobaia, a village in Boșorod Commune, Hunedoara County
 Bobaia River, a tributary of the Luncani River in Romania
 Bobaia oil field, an oil field located in Aninoasa, Gorj County